

Route

Reading to Birmingham
Didcot | Abingdon-on-Thames | Radley | Oxford |
Banbury | Stratford upon Avon | Bromsgrove | Birmingham

Route 5, as signposted between Stratford-upon-Avon and Birmingham, runs via Bromsgrove and at the latter stages through Birmingham's south-western suburbs, primarily off-road.

Birmingham to Chester

Stoke on Trent

The route has a junction with National Cycle Route 56 north of Chester Zoo.

Chester to Holyhead

Chester | Conwy | Bangor | Menai Bridge | Holyhead

The track leaves Chester (and England) on the Northern bank of the River Dee. Crossing into Wales, the high quality track crosses the Dee at the side of Hawarden Bridge and then enters the town of Shotton. At this stage the National Cycle Route heads inland and follows a series of quiet roads. Unfortunately the road surfaces are sometimes poor and gradients steep. There are plans to create a better quality route following the coast.

At Talacre the coastal route improves again. It passes through a large caravan site and golf course en route to Prestatyn. From Prestatyn westwards the route hugs the coast and in many places one is just a few metres from the sea.

The path continues through Rhyl where it crosses the River Clwyd and then to Kinmel Bay, Pensarn, Llanddulas, Colwyn Bay and Llandudno. The Llandudno promenade, although not on the official route, is a much better route than the official line which was created before the promenade was opened to cyclists after a long campaign.

The path was much improved West of Conwy in September 2012 by the creation of a traffic free cycle path which now bypasses a particularly dangerous stretch of the A55. Heading further west, the path is highly engineered around the Penmaenmawr area before following quiet lanes into Bangor.

Since 2012, Wales Coast Path in North Wales follows part of the Reading to Holyhead National Cycle Route 5.

It crosses (with road traffic) the Menai Suspension Bridge and terminates in Holyhead. Much of the road across Anglesey follows country lanes rather than dedicated bike tracks.

References

External links

Sustrans Route 5

National Cycle Routes
Transport in Oxfordshire
Transport in Warwickshire
Transport in Worcestershire
Transport in Staffordshire
Transport in Cheshire